Christian III generally refers to Christian III of Denmark. It may also refer to:

 Christian III, Count of Oldenburg (d. 1285)
 Christian III, Count Palatine of Zweibrücken (1674–1735)
 Christian III Maurice, Duke of Saxe-Merseburg (1680–1694)